A list of people, who died during the 21st century, who have received recognition as Blessed (through beatification) or Saint (through canonization) from the Catholic Church:

References

See also 

Christianity in the 21st century

21
 Christian saints
21st-century venerated Christians
Lists of 21st-century people

ru:Хронологический список католических блаженных и святых XX века